Tinatin "Tina" Khidasheli (born 8 June 1973) is a Georgian jurist and politician. A Republican Party member and former civil society activist, she was appointed as Georgia's Minister of Defense on 1 May 2015, becoming the country's first ever female defense minister. She resigned on 1 August 2016, after her party decided to leave the ruling Georgian Dream coalition. 

Khidasheli is married to David Usupashvili, the former chairman of the Parliament of Georgia.

Education and early career 
Born in Tbilisi, Tina Khidasheli graduated from Tbilisi State University with a degree in international law in 1995. She became a Master of Political Science at the Central European University in Budapest in 1996. She was a human rights fellow at the Washington College of Law, and World fellow of Yale University. Having worked for several governmental and international organizations in Georgia, Khidasheli assumed presidency of the influential human rights group Georgian Young Lawyers' Association (GYLA) from 2000 to 2004. At the same time, she served as member of the State Anti-Corruption Council from 2002 to 2004. One of the vocal critics of the government of the-then President of Georgia Eduard Shevardnadze, Khidasheli was energetically involved in protest movement which brought about Shevardnadze's resignation in the Rose Revolution in November 2003. She, however, distanced herself from the new government led by Mikheil Saakashvili, her ally in the political struggle against Shevardnadze.

Later career 

After a brief tenure as a Chairperson of the Board of Open Society Georgia Foundation (Soros Foundation) from 2004 to 2005, Khidasheli joined the Republican Party of Georgia, led by her husband, David Usupashvili. She served as that party's secretary for international affairs from 2005 to 2009. She was elected to the Council of Tbilisi in 2010 and entered the Parliament of Georgia after the Georgian Dream coalition, of which the Republican Party was member, defeated Saakashvili-led United National Movement in the 2012 election. She chaired the parliamentary committee on European integration. In May 2015, Khidasheli succeeded Mindia Janelidze as Georgia's Defense Minister. During her tenure, Khidasheli sought close cooperation with NATO and the United States. She also announced an intention to the end of compulsory conscription as part of military reforms. After the Republican Party decided to leave the Georgian Dream coalition ahead of the scheduled October 2016 parliamentary election, Khidasheli filed resignation and was succeeded by the former security official Levan Izoria. Khidasheli herself criticized the government's choice of her successor.

See also 
 First women lawyers around the world
Tina KHIDASHELI and Kristin Krohn DEVOLD: Female Defense Ministers from Georgia and Norway discuss NATO, gender, civil society: interview for Caucasian Journal (2021)

References 

1973 births
Living people
Female defence ministers
Government ministers of Georgia (country)
Jurists from Georgia (country)
Lawyers from Tbilisi
Members of the Parliament of Georgia
Georgian Dream politicians
Politicians from Tbilisi
Tbilisi State University alumni
Women government ministers of Georgia (country)
Women lawyers from Georgia (country)
21st-century women politicians from Georgia (country)
21st-century politicians from Georgia (country)